Zawistowszczyzna  is a village in the administrative district of Gmina Sokółka, within Sokółka County, Podlaskie Voivodeship, in north-eastern Poland, close to the border with Belarus.

Since March 2007, the sołtys (village chief) is Dr. Mohamed Ali Al-Hameri, a gynaecologist born in Yemen who came to Poland in 1983 to study medicine.

References

Zawistowszczyzna